Mitali Singh (née Mukherjee) is an Indian-Bangladeshi classical and playback singer, she hails from Mymensingh, Bangladesh. She received the National Film Award of Bangladesh in 1982 for the song Ei Dunia Ekhon To Ar for the film Dui Poishar Alta.

Early life and education
Mukherjee was born in 1962 in Mymensingh to her parents Amulya Kumar Mukherjee and Kalyani Mukherjee.
She began her formal training in classical music under Pt. Mithun Dey. She studied music at Maharaja Sayajirao University of Baroda.

Career

Mukherjee's first album "Saahil" was released by HMV. She collaborated with lyricist Gulzar for her album "Chand Parosa Hai".  She has sung in several languages, including Punjabi, Gujarati and Tamil.

Mukherjee served as  the judge of the television shows Sa Re Ga Ma Pa and Shera Kontho.

Awards
"Gaan-e Gaan-e Gunijon Shongbordhona" by Citi Bank (2015)

Songs list

Tamil songs

 Yamunai Aatrile from Movie “Thalapati “ by Illayaraja

Punjabi
Album: Woh Bura Maan Gaye
Song: Saajan Mujhse Roothe

Bengali songs

Film songs

Non-film songs

Personal life
Mukherjee was married to Ghazal singer Bhupinder Singh since 1983. She resides in Mumbai. Her siblings include Pradip Mukherjee and Deepak Mukherjee (d. 1988).

References 

Living people
People from Mymensingh District
21st-century Bangladeshi women singers
21st-century Bangladeshi singers
Bangladeshi Hindus
20th-century Bangladeshi women singers
20th-century Bangladeshi singers
Singers from Mumbai
Maharaja Sayajirao University of Baroda alumni
Best Female Playback Singer National Film Award (Bangladesh) winners
Year of birth missing (living people)